Yeomposan is a mountain in Buk-gu, Ulsan, South Korea.

See also
Geography of South Korea
List of mountains in Korea
List of mountains by elevation
Mountain portal
South Korea portal

References

Mountains of Ulsan
Mountains of South Gyeongsang Province
Buk District, Ulsan
Mountains of South Korea